Oakfield is a former unincorporated community in Audubon County, Iowa, United States, located a half mile east of Brayton.

History
The first store was built in Oakfield in 1855, and the town name was suggested by a resident who originally came from Oakfield, New York.  The first school was built in 1858.  When the railroad passed through Brayton, however, it began to decline.  By 1929, it was reduced to only a general store and a few houses.(24 July 1971). Oakfield, A Town That Dies Hard, Atlantic Farm Monthly  The Oakfield Academy school operated for many years, and has been preserved.Madrid, Jackie (19 July 2018). Oakfield Academy: Time Stands Still, Audubon County Advocate JournalHays, Margaret (December 1989) The Saving of a Landmark, Atlantic Farm Monthly

A post office was established in Oakfield in 1859, and remained in operation until it was discontinued in 1875.

References

Unincorporated communities in Audubon County, Iowa
1859 establishments in Iowa
Populated places established in 1859
Unincorporated communities in Iowa